Busbridge is a surname. Notable people with the surname include: 

Bill Busbridge (1885–1943), Australian rules footballer 
Ida Busbridge (1908–1988), British mathematician
Norm Busbridge (1887–1953), Australian rules footballer 
Phil Busbridge (1920–1975), Australian rules footballer